Mahiriki Tangaroa (born 1973) is a New Zealand-born Cook Islands photographer and painter. She is a former director of the Cook Islands National Museum. She is recognised as a leading contemporary Cook Islands artist, and her work is regularly exhibited in galleries in New Zealand and the Cook Islands.

Of Cook Islands heritage, Tangaroa was born in Auckland, New Zealand, and grew up in Christchurch. She studied photography at the University of Canterbury School of Fine Arts, before returning to the Cook Islands in 1998.

In 2000 she was appointed director of the Cook Islands National Museum, a position she held for three years. She subsequently worked as the director of the Beachcomber Gallery in Avarua.

She began to paint in 1999. Her work is inspired by ancient Cook Islands art and artefacts, including the "fisherman's god" Tangaroa, the war god Rongo and the goddess of Aitutaki. In 2010 she was invited to curate the exhibition Atua: sacred art from Polynesia, which was displayed at the National Gallery of Australia and the St. Louis Art Museum in the USA.

Tangaroa is the niece of Cook Islands politician Tina Browne.

Selected exhibitions
 2019: Earth, Wind & Fire, Irrespective of Place, Bergman Gallery (Rarotonga)
 2019: Kia Maeva Tatou, Bergman Gallery (Rarotonga)
 2019: Auckland Art Fair, Bergman Gallery (Auckland, NZ)
 2016: Blessed again by the Gods, Bergman Gallery (Rarotonga)
 2010: MANUIA,  BCA Gallery @ the American Indian Community House, New York
 1999: Tu Fa’atasi, Aotea Centre (Auckland, NZ)
 2009: M101, BCA Gallery, Photographic Exhibition (Rarotonga)
 2008: Mangoes in the Morning, Gallery De Novo (Dunedin, NZ)
 2008: Exit of Itoro, Reef Gallery (Auckland, NZ)
 2003: Avatea, Letham Gallery (Auckland, NZ)
 1998: Paringa Ou, Cook Islands National Museum, Fiji Museum, Fisher Gallery (Auckland, NZ)

References

1973 births
Cook Island artists
New Zealand artists
University of Canterbury alumni
Living people